Anna Uhrväder (1759-1815), was a Finnish milliner.

She was based in Turku, which was the capital in Finland at the time. She manufactured as well as sold various fashion items. She had a successful career between 1804 and 1812, when she was the leading of her profession in Finland, with clients among the rich burgher class as well as the nobility.

References

1759 births
1815 deaths
19th-century Finnish businesswomen
Milliners
19th-century Finnish businesspeople